The Tigers Army Parachute Display Team is a freefall parachute team of the British Army.

History
The unit was formed in South Cambridgeshire in 1986 under the Queen's Division. The Queen's Division was formed in 1968. On 9 September 1992, the Queen's Regiment amalgamated with the Royal Hampshire Regiment.

Some soldiers in the division had the chance to parachute with 5 Airborne Brigade, part of 5th Infantry Brigade. The team has competed in the World Parachuting Championships. The team is registered with the British Parachute Association (BPA) and the British Air Display Association.

References

External links
 The Tigers FFT

1986 establishments in the United Kingdom
Military parachuting in the United Kingdom
Military units and formations established in 1986
Military units and formations in Cambridgeshire
Parachute display teams
Parachuting in Germany
Princess of Wales's Royal Regiment
South Cambridgeshire District